MS Arvia is an  in service for P&O Cruises, a subsidiary of Carnival Corporation & plc. Built by German shipbuilder Meyer Werft in Papenburg, she was delivered on 9 December 2022 to P&O Cruises. At about 184,700 gross tonnage, Arvia is the largest ship to be commissioned for the British cruise market. Arvia was floated out on 27 August 2022. Arvias normal operating capacity is 5,200 passengers even though its maximum capacity if 3rd and 4th berths are used is 6,264 passengers. Arvia was supposed to have her maiden voyage on 9 December 2022 but due to operational reasons, this was delayed to 23 December 2022. It's maiden voyage was a 14 night Canary Island cruise from Southampton. On 2 March 2023, P&O cruises announced that Arvias godmother will be Nicole Scherzinger.

Design
Arvia has over 30 bars and restaurants onboard. The design is similar to its sister ship,  with a some differences.

First of all, unlike Iona, Arvia has two included Freedom Restaurants (Main Dining Rooms) and two included themed dining venues. Iona has four included Freedom restaurants. The included themed dining venues are the 6th Steet Diner which is themed after a traditional American diner and The Olive Grove which is a Mediterranean-style restaurant. Even though, The Olive Grove is also available on Iona, there are a few differences. The first difference is that their is no supplements for selected dishes on the Arvia menu unlike Iona and also that Arvias The Olive Grove is located on deck 6 instead of deck 8. Their are also a few specialty (extra) dining venues including Keel & Cow which is a gastropub, Green & Co which is a fish and plant-based restaurant, Sindhu which is an Indian restaurant and the Epicurean which is a fine dining venue.

Another difference between Iona and Arvia is the atrium on Arvia has a more wooden tone while on Iona, it uses more marble. Like Iona, their are four swimming pools on Arvia including two infinity pools. Arvia also has 20 whirlpools including 10 infinity whirlpools.  Arvia also has a skydome with a retractable glass roof and a seascreen (outdoor cinema screen). Arvia also has an activity zone with a ropes course and adventure golf.

References

Ships of P&O Cruises
Ships built in Papenburg
2022 ships